Kipshenga is a rural locality (a village) in Terebayevskoye Rural Settlement, Nikolsky District, Vologda Oblast, Russia. The population was 173 as of 2002.

Geography 
Kipshenga is located 20 km north of Nikolsk (the district's administrative centre) by road. Myakishevo is the nearest rural locality.

References 

Rural localities in Nikolsky District, Vologda Oblast